The fourth season of the anime series Inuyasha aired in Japan on ytv from August 19, 2002, through May 12, 2003. It is the first season of the series to be produced and broadcast in High Definition, while maintaining its standard 4:3 aspect ratio. Based on the manga series of the same title by Rumiko Takahashi, the anime was produced by Sunrise. The series continues a half demon Inuyasha's and a high school girl Kagome Higurashi's journey alongside their friends Shippo, Miroku and Sango to obtain the fragments of the shattered Jewel of Four Souls, a powerful jewel that had been hidden inside Kagome's body, and keep the shards from being used for evil.

The anime is licensed for release in North America by Viz Media. The English dub of the fourth season was broadcast on Cartoon Network as part of its Adult Swim programming block from January 18, 2005, through July 23, 2005.


Episode list

References

2002 Japanese television seasons
2003 Japanese television seasons
Season 4
